This article refers to the Grande Dixence Corporation; for the dam of the same name see Grande Dixence Dam

Grande Dixence S.A. is a Société Anonyme operating in Switzerland which runs the Bieudron Hydro Project and the Grande Dixence Dam in the Val d'Hérens, Valais. Grande Dixence is primarily concerned with the production of hydroelectricity by harnessing the hydropower associated with the steep changes of elevation found in the part of the Alps.

Shareholders
The company has a share capital of 300 million CHF, divided between four shareholders.

énergie ouest suisse (eos)	60%
Canton of Basel-City (Industrielle Werke Basel) 	13 %
BKW FMB Energie S.A. 	13 %
Forces Motrices du Nord-Est de la Suisse S.A. (Nordostschweizerische Kraftwerke) 	13 %

Valais